The Case of Lady Camber is a 1920 British silent mystery film directed by Walter West and starring Violet Hopson, Stewart Rome and Gregory Scott. Lord Camber comes under suspicion of murdering his wife, an ex-chorus girl. It was adapted from a 1915 play of the same title by Horace Annesley Vachell. It was made at Walthamstow Studios.

Cast
 Violet Hopson as Esther Yorke 
 Stewart Rome as Dr. Harley Napier 
 Gregory Scott as Lord Camber 
 Mercy Hatton as Lady Camber 
 C. M. Hallard as Sir Bedford Slufter 
 Polly Emery as Peach

References

External links

1920 films
British silent feature films
British mystery films
Films directed by Walter West
British films based on plays
Films set in England
Films set in London
Films shot at Walthamstow Studios
British black-and-white films
1920 mystery films
1920s English-language films
1920s British films
Silent mystery films